Timothy Turtle is a 1946 picture book written by Al Graham and illustrated by Tony Palazzo. Timothy Turtle needs help from his friends after he gets flipped onto his shell. The book was a recipient of a 1947 Caldecott Honor for its illustrations.

References

1946 children's books
American picture books
Caldecott Honor-winning works
Books about turtles